Apleuroceras is a genus of ceratitid ammonites with an essentially smooth evolute shell with a subquadrade whorl section and a ceratitic suture with two lateral lobes (on either side).  Apleuroceras belongs to the Aplococeratidae and has been found in middle Triassic formations of Ladinian age in Hungary and the Alps.

References 

 Arkell et al 1957. Mesozoic Ammonoidea; Treatise on Invertebrate Paleontology, Part L (L158). Geological Society of America and University Kansas Press.
 Paleobiology database Apleuroceras entry accessed 9 December 2011

Aplococeratidae
Middle Triassic ammonites
Ceratitida genera
Triassic ammonites of Europe